Yugoslavia competed at the 1975 Mediterranean Games held in Algiers, Algeria.

Medalists

External links
Yugoslavia at the 1975 Mediterranean Games at the Olympic Museum Belgrade website
1975 Official Report at the International Mediterranean Games Committee

Nations at the 1975 Mediterranean Games
1975
Mediterranean Games